Tamblyn Drugs was a chain of pharmacies in Canada founded by Gordon Tamblyn.

Founder and Tamblyn banner
Gordon Tamblyn was born in Belwood, Ontario in 1878. He apprenticed to a druggist in Whitby, Ontario for a few months before enrolling in the Ontario College of Pharmacy. After graduating in 1901 he began work at the Burgess-Powell Pharmacy, on Yonge Street in Toronto. In 1904, with capital of $500, he opened his own pharmacy at Queen Street East and Lee Avenue, in Toronto’s Beaches neighbourhood.

Tamblyn’s Cut Rate Drugs featured a soda fountain like many druggists of that period, and offered a delivery service. He opened a second store in 1907, and in 1910 took over another store from a retiring pharmacist.

In 1911, Tamblyn incorporated his business, and began adding new locations almost every year, eventually expanding into other parts of Ontario. During the 1920s, Tamblyn’s chain expanded to about 60 stores, primarily in Toronto and area. Tamblyn died on August 17, 1933, during a round of golf at the age of 55.

As subsidiary 1960 to present

George Weston Limited purchased the chain in 1960, and continued to operate it alongside its Loblaws chain of grocery store, creating a "T" logo to match Loblaws' L logo. The chain declined under Weston's management and was sold to the United Kingdom’s Boots Group chain in 1978. Boots changed the stores over to the Boots name, and sold the chain in 1988 to Oshawa Group which converted them to the Pharma Plus banner in 1989. In 1997, Pharma Plus was purchased by Katz Group of Companies and re-badged as Rexall beginning in 2015. In 2016 Katz sold Rexall to McKesson Canada. 

While the Tamblyn name is long gone, some Rexall units have been continuously operated since the original Tamblyn ownership.

See also
List of pharmacies

Retail companies established in 1904
Canadian pharmacy brands
Defunct retail companies of Canada
1904 establishments in Ontario
Retail companies disestablished in 1978
1978 disestablishments in Ontario